Maxie Callaway Baughan Jr. (born August 3, 1938) is a former American football linebacker who played in the National Football League (NFL) for the Philadelphia Eagles, Los Angeles Rams, and the Washington Redskins. Baughan played college football at Georgia Tech.

College career
While at Georgia Tech, Baughan played and started at both linebacker and center. In 1959, he was Georgia Tech's captain, an All-American, the Southeastern Conference Lineman of the Year, and the Most Valuable Player in the 1960 Gator Bowl. He set a Georgia Tech single-season record with 124 tackles. Baughan was inducted into the Georgia Tech Hall of Fame in 1965 and the College Football Hall of Fame in 1988.

NFL career
Baughan was selected in the second round of the 1960 NFL Draft by the Eagles as the 20th player chosen overall and became an immediate starter for the team at right side linebacker. Baughan played the next 10 years in the NFL and was voted all-pro seven times. At the conclusion of his rookie season, the Eagles won the 1960 NFL Championship, the last title for the franchise until their victory in Super Bowl LII over the New England Patriots. Baughan was selected to the Pro Bowl for the first of nine times that year, finishing the game with three interceptions. All told, Baughan would make the Pro Bowl five out of six years during his time with the Eagles. During a December 12, 1965 in a game against the Pittsburgh Steelers, the Eagles intercepted a team-record nine passes en route to a 47-13 win.  Six of those points came courtesy of Baughan when he returned a first quarter interception by Steelers quarterback Bill Nelsen 33 yards for the lone touchdown of his NFL career.

By 1966, the number of games the Eagles won had sharply declined and Baughan decided that he wanted out of Philadelphia. However, George Allen, who was entering his first season as an NFL head coach with the Los Angeles Rams, won the right to Baughan's services by sending two players (linebacker Fred Brown and defensive tackle Frank Molden ) to the Eagles in return. Baughan and Allen would develop a strong relationship, spending extensive time studying game film together. Baughan would later state that he learned more about football from Allen than anyone else. Baughan was chosen to be the Rams' defensive captain and was in charge of signal calling for the unit. He was selected for the Pro Bowl in each of his first four seasons with the Rams and was also named 1st Team All-Pro three times.  After an injury-plagued 1970 season, in which he played in only 10 games, Baughan retired from the NFL. 

Baughan's contractual rights were traded along with Jack Pardee, Myron Pottios, Diron Talbert, John Wilbur, Jeff Jordan and a 1971 fifth-round pick (124th overall–traded to Green Bay Packers for Boyd Dowler) from the Rams to the Washington Redskins for Marlin McKeever, first and third rounders in 1971 (10th and 63rd overall–Isiah Robertson and Dave Elmendorf respectively) and third, fourth, fifth, sixth and seventh rounders in 1972 (73rd, 99th, 125th, 151st and 177th overall–to New England Patriots, traded to Philadelphia Eagles for Joe Carollo, Bob Christiansen, Texas Southern defensive tackle Eddie Herbert and to New York Giants respectively) on January 28, 1971.

From 1972 to 1973, he was an assistant coach and defensive coordinator at Georgia Tech. In 1974, Allen, now the head coach of the Redskins, talked Baughan into a brief return to the NFL as a player-coach. At the conclusion of that season, Baughan retired. He finished with 18 interceptions (including 1 returned for a touchdown) and 10 fumble recoveries in 147 games played.

Coaching career
From 1975 to 1982, he was a defensive coordinator for the Baltimore Colts and Detroit Lions. During his time with the Colts, the team won three straight AFC East divisional championships from 1975 to 1977. He became head football coach at Cornell University in 1983, and his 1988 team was co-champion of the Ivy League. It was Cornell's first championship since 1971. Baughan was forced to resign as head coach at Cornell after information surfaced about an affair he had with an assistant coach's wife.  Baughan then returned to the NFL for stints as an assistant with the Minnesota Vikings, the Tampa Bay Buccaneers and, finally, the Baltimore Ravens.  He retired from coaching in 1998.

Honors
In addition to being a member of the Georgia Tech and College Football Halls of Fame, Baughan has also been inducted into the Georgia Sports Hall of Fame (1980), the Alabama Sports Hall of Fame (1983) and the Gator Bowl Hall of Fame.  However, he has not yet been inducted into the Pro Football Hall of Fame, last reaching the Semifinalist stage in 2022. In 2005, he was named to the Professional  Football Researchers Association Hall of Very Good in the association's third HOVG class.

In 2012 Baughan received the Outstanding Eagle Scout Award from the National Eagle Scout Association of the Boy Scouts of America. On August 4, 2015, the Philadelphia Eagles announced that Baughan will be inducted into the Philadelphia Eagles Hall of Fame on Monday, October 19. That day, the team played the New York Giants on Monday Night Football.

Head coaching record

References

External links
 

1938 births
Living people
American football centers
American football linebackers
Baltimore Ravens coaches
Cornell Big Red football coaches
Detroit Lions coaches
Georgia Tech Yellow Jackets football coaches
Georgia Tech Yellow Jackets football players
Los Angeles Rams players
Minnesota Vikings coaches
Philadelphia Eagles players
Tampa Bay Buccaneers coaches
Washington Redskins coaches
Washington Redskins players
All-American college football players
Eastern Conference Pro Bowl players
Western Conference Pro Bowl players
Bessemer City High School (Alabama) alumni
People from Greene County, Alabama
Coaches of American football from Alabama
Players of American football from Alabama